is a Japanese science fiction writer. He graduated from the Osaka Institute of Technology, and worked as a volunteer in Nepal and the Philippines. He made his professional debut with the story 137th Mobile Brigade in 1979 while still in Nepal.

He is known mostly for his hard science fiction works, for which he won the Seiun Award three times (twice for Best Novel, and once for Best Short Story), and the Nitta Jirō Culture Award once.

He is a member of the Mystery Writers of Japan, the Science Fiction and Fantasy Writers of Japan, the Space Authors Club, and an associate member of the Hard SF Laboratory. Tani currently lives in Komatsu in Ishikawa Prefecture.

History
Tani studied at the Osaka Institute of Technology, graduating from the engineering department with a degree in civil engineering. After graduating, he helped coordinate construction work by the Japan Overseas Cooperation Volunteers in Nepal, and also worked with the Japan International Cooperation Agency in the Philippines.

His debut work, was published in the March 1979 issue of Kisō Tengai magazine, for which he won an honorable mention in the 2nd Kisō Tengai SF Rookie of the Year Awards in 1980. He published , beginning his close association with hard science fiction adventure novels. From that point, he also began to publish many stories of what he styled as "future history", including his novel .

In 1987, Tani's  won the Seiun Award for "Best Japanese Short Story of the Year".

His story  was awarded the Nitta Jirō Culture Award in 1996.

Works in English translation
 "Q-Cruiser Basilisk" (Speculative Japan 2, Kurodahan Press, 2011)
 The Erinys Incident (Kurodahan Press, 2018)

References

External links
 NHK interview and review
 SF-Fantasy.com interview

1951 births
Japanese science fiction writers
Living people
People from Itami, Hyōgo
Japan International Cooperation Agency
Writers from Hyōgo Prefecture